Berryville may refer to:
Berryville, Arkansas
Berry, Kentucky, formerly known as Berryville 
Berryville, Texas 
Berryville, Virginia
Berryville, West Virginia

See also
Barryville (disambiguation)
Berrysville, Ohio